Robert Deodaat Emile "Ootje" Oxenaar (7 October 1929 – 13 June 2017) was a Dutch graphic artist, visual artist, commissioner, and professor.

Biography
Oxenaar was a student at the Royal Academy of Art, The Hague and graduated in 1953 with honours. He later was a lecturer at the Royal Academy of Fine Arts in The Hague between 1958 and 1970 and taught as Professor of Visual Communication at the Delft University of Technology between 1978 and 1992.

As Head of the Art and Design advisory bureau (DEV/K+V) at the Dutch Postal and Telecommunications (PTT / KPN) from 1976 to 1994, he was responsible for the commissioning of art and design for the largest Dutch public concern, and served as aesthetic advisor to the Dutch National Bank, the Ministry of Justice in the Netherlands and the Danish Ministry of Transport. His influence on the next generation of designers was extensive as a commissioner, teacher, and international lecturer, in the Netherlands, Europe, and the US.

From 1964 to 1987, Oxenaar was commissioned two series of banknotes by The Nederlandsche Bank (DNB) and was responsible for the revolutionary design of the 'Snip' (100), the Sunflower (50) and Lighthouse (250) banknotes which were internationally celebrated as the most beautiful and least countrified money in the world. His banknotes stayed in circulation from 1964 until being replaced by the Euro in 2002.

R.D.E. Oxenaar was also a prolific designer of acclaimed posters, books, and postage stamps. His graphic design work is represented in various collections, including Centre Georges-Pompidou in Paris, Gemeentemuseum Den Haag, Museum of Modern Art (MoMA) and Stedelijk Museum Amsterdam. Oxenaar's work is preserved in the Nederlands Archief Grafisch Ontwerpers, Utrecht (NAGO).

Oxenaar was member of the Alliance Graphique International (AGI) and an honorary member of the Association of Dutch Designers (BNO).

In 2000 Oxenaar emigrated to the United States where he continued his studio practice and taught in the Graphic Design Department at Rhode Island School of Design (RISD), Providence.

Oxenaar was knighted in the Order of Orange Nassau, and the recipient of the Medal of Honour for Art and Science in the House Order of Orange bestowed by Queen Beatrix in 2004.

Oxenaar was married to Dawn Barrett, designer and former Dean of Architecture and Design at Rhode Island School of Design, and President of Massachusetts College of Art and Design. Together they had two children.

List of banknotes by Ootje Oxenaar

Citations

Bibliography

External links
Gallery of posters

1929 births
2017 deaths
Dutch graphic designers
Dutch currency designers
Dutch typographers and type designers
Royal Academy of Art, The Hague alumni
Rhode Island School of Design faculty
Academic staff of the Delft University of Technology
Artists from The Hague